Alfredo Quesada Farías (born 22 September 1949) is a Peruvian football midfielder who played for Peru in the 1978 FIFA World Cup. He also played for Sporting Cristal.

International career
Quesada earned 50 caps, scoring one goal, for Peru between 1971 and 1978.

References

External links

1949 births
Living people
People from Talara
Peruvian footballers
Peru international footballers
Association football midfielders
Peruvian Primera División players
Sporting Cristal footballers
1975 Copa América players
1978 FIFA World Cup players
Copa América-winning players